Inthakhin is a tambon (sub-district) of Mae Taeng District, in Chiang Mai Province, Thailand. In 2014 it had a population of 12,867 people.

Administration

Central administration
The tambon is divided into 19 administrative villages (muban).

Local administration
The area of the sub-district is shared by two local governments.
the town (thesaban mueang) Mueang Kaen Phatthana (เทศบาลเมืองเมืองแกนพัฒนา)
the sub-district municipality Inthakhin (เทศบาลตำบลอินทขิล)

References

Tambon of Chiang Mai province
Populated places in Chiang Mai province